Secular Jew may refer to:
 A general epithet for Jews who participate in modern secular society and are not stringently religious
 Nonreligious Jews, including nonaffiliated, agnostics, etc.
Jewish atheism 
 Cultural Judaism
 Hiloni, "secular", a social category in Israel designating nonobservant Jews
 Jewish secularism, secular definition of Jewish collective existence